Reymond can refer to:

People
Adolphe Reymond (1896-1976), Swiss footballer
Arnold Reymond (1874-1958), Swiss philosopher
Cauã Reymond (born 1980), Brazilian actor
Emil du Bois-Reymond (1818-1896), German physician and physiologist
Gabriel Reymond (born 1923), Swiss racewalker
Jean Reymond (born 1912), Monaco politician
Marcel Reymond (born 1911), Swiss ski jumper
Maurice Reymond (1862 -1936), Swiss artist
Paul du Bois-Reymond (1831-1889), German mathematician
Robert L. Reymond, American theologian

See also
Villard-Reymond